Juan Dávila was mayor of Ponce, Puerto Rico, in 1819. His Secretario Municipal (municipal clerk) was Matias Vidal.

There is a street in Urbanización Las Delicias of Barrio Magueyes in Ponce named after him.

See also

 List of Puerto Ricans
 List of mayors of Ponce, Puerto Rico

References

Mayors of Ponce, Puerto Rico
1760s births
1830s deaths
Year of death uncertain
Year of birth uncertain